Fischer Sheffey Black (January 11, 1938 – August 30, 1995) was an American economist, best known as one of the authors of the Black–Scholes equation.

Background

Fischer Sheffey Black was born on January 11, 1938. He graduated from Harvard College in 1959 and received a PhD in applied mathematics from Harvard University in 1964. He was initially expelled from the PhD program due to his inability to settle on a thesis topic, having switched from physics to mathematics, then to computers and artificial intelligence. Black joined the consultancy Bolt, Beranek and Newman, working on a system for artificial intelligence. He spent a summer developing his ideas at the RAND corporation. He became a student of  MIT professor Marvin Minsky, and was later able to submit his research for completion of the Harvard PhD.

Black joined Arthur D. Little, where he was first exposed to economic and financial consulting and where he met his future collaborator Jack Treynor. In 1971, he began to work at the University of Chicago.  He later left the University of Chicago in 1975 to work at the MIT Sloan School of Management.  In 1984, he joined Goldman Sachs where he worked until death.

Economic career

Black began thinking seriously about monetary policy around 1970 and found, at this time, that the big debate in this field was between Keynesians and monetarists. The Keynesians (under the leadership of Franco Modigliani) believe there is a natural tendency of the credit markets toward instability, toward boom and bust, and they assign to both monetary and fiscal policy roles in damping down this cycle, working toward the goal of smooth sustainable growth.  In the Keynesian view, central bankers have to have discretionary powers to fulfill their role properly.  Monetarists, under the leadership of Milton Friedman, believe that discretionary central banking is the problem, not the solution.  Friedman believed that the growth of the money supply could and should be set at a constant rate, say 3% a year, to accommodate predictable growth in real GDP.

On the basis of the capital asset pricing model, Black concluded that discretionary monetary policy could not do the good that Keynesians wanted it to do. He concluded that monetary policy should be passive within an economy. But he also concluded that it could not do the harm monetarists feared it would do.  Black said in a letter to Friedman, in January 1972:

In the U.S. economy, much of the public debt is in the form of Treasury bills. Each week, some of these bills mature, and new bills are sold. If the Federal Reserve System tries to inject money into the private sector, the private sector will simply turn around and exchange its money for Treasury bills at the next auction. If the Federal Reserve withdraws money, the private sector will allow some of its Treasury bills to mature without replacing them.

In 1973, Black, along with Myron Scholes, published the paper 'The Pricing of Options and Corporate Liabilities' in 'The Journal of Political Economy'. This was his most famous work and included the Black–Scholes equation.

In March 1976, Black proposed that human capital and business have "ups and downs that are largely unpredictable [...] because of basic uncertainty about what people will want in the future and about what the economy will be able to produce in the future. If future tastes and technology were known, profits and wages would grow smoothly and surely over time." A boom is a period when technology matches well with demand. A bust is a period of mismatch.  This view made Black an early contributor to real business cycle theory.

Economist Tyler Cowen has argued that Black's work on monetary economics and business cycles can be used to explain the Great Recession.

Black's works on monetary theory, business cycles and options are parts of his vision of a unified framework. He once stated: I like the beauty and symmetry in Mr. Treynor's equilibrium models so much that I started designing them myself. I worked on models in several areas: Monetary theory, Business cycles, Options and warrantsFor 20 years, I have been struggling to show people the beauty in these models to pass on knowledge I received from Mr. Treynor.In monetary theory --- the theory of how money is related to economic activity --- I am still struggling. In business cycle theory --- the theory of fluctuation in the economy --- I am still struggling. In options and warrants, though, people see the beauty.It can be shown that the mathematical techniques developed in the option theory can be extended to provide a mathematical analysis of monetary theory and business cycles as well.

Business Cycles and Equilibrium (1987)
Fischer Black has published many academic articles, including his most known book, Business Cycles and Equilibrium. In this book, Black proposes at the beginning of the book to imagine a world where money does not exist. With its theory that economic and financial markets are in a continual equilibrium-is one of his books that still rings true today, given the current economic crisis. Building upon these statements, Black creates models as well as challenges monetary theorists, especially those who subscribe to the ideas of the quantity theory of money and liquidity of money. Banks are the main institutions of monetary transactions in Black's book, to which he also states that money is an endogenous resource (contrary to monetarists who believe money to be an exogenous resource), provided by banks due to profit maximization. Controversial statements such as "Monetary and exchange rate policies accomplish almost nothing, and fiscal policies are unimportant in causing or changing business cycles" have made Black enemies with Keynesians and Monetarists alike.

Illness and death
In early 1994, Black was diagnosed with throat cancer. Surgery at first appeared successful, and Black was well enough to attend the annual meeting of the International Association of Financial Engineers that October, where he received their award as Financial Engineer of the Year. However, the cancer returned, and Black died in August 1995.

Posthumous recognition
The Nobel Prize is not given posthumously, so it was not awarded to Black in 1997 when his co-author Myron Scholes received the honor for their landmark work on option pricing along with Robert C. Merton, another pioneer in the development of valuation of stock options.  However, when announcing the award that year, the Nobel committee did prominently mention Black's key role.

Black has also received recognition as the co-author of the Black–Derman–Toy interest rate derivatives model, which was developed for in-house use by Goldman Sachs in the 1980s but eventually published. He also co-authored the Black–Litterman model on global asset allocation while at Goldman Sachs.

The Advisory Board of The Journal of Performance Measurement inducted Black into the Performance & Risk Measurement Hall of Fame in 2017. The announcement appears in the Winter 2016/2017 issue of the journal. The Hall of Fame recognizes individuals who have made significant contributions to investment performance and risk measurement.

Fischer Black Prize

In 2002, the American Finance Association established the biennially awarded Fischer Black Prize in memory of Fischer Black.  The award is given to a young researcher whose body of work "best exemplifies the Fischer Black hallmark of developing original research that is relevant to finance practice".

See also
 Shadow rate - A concept created by Fischer Black in "Interest Rates as Options"

Selected bibliography
 F. Black, Myron Scholes, & Michael Jensen, "The Capital-Asset Pricing Model: Some empirical tests", in Jensen, editor, Studies in the Theory of Capital Markets (1972).
 F. Black, "Active and Passive Monetary Policy in a Neoclassical Model", The Journal of Finance, Vol. 27, No. 4 (Sep., 1972), pp. 801–814.
 Fischer Black & Myron Scholes, "The Pricing of Options and Corporate Liabilities", Journal of Political Economy (1973).
 F. Black & M. Scholes, "The Effects of Dividend Yield and Dividend Policy on Common Stock Prices and Returns", Journal of Financial Economics (1974).
 F. Black, "Fact and Fantasy in the Use of Options", Financial Analysts Journal 31, pp36–41, 61–72 (July/August 1975).
 F. Black, "The Pricing of Commodity Contracts", 1976, Journal of Financial Economics.
 F. Black, "Noise", Journal of Finance, vol. 41, pp. 529–543 (1986).
 Fischer Black, Business Cycles and Equilibrium, Basil Blackwell, 1987. ISBN 0470499176
 F. Black, E. Derman, & W. Toy, "A One-Factor Model of Interest Rates and its Application to Treasury Bond Options", Financial Analyst Journal (1990).
 F. Black & R. Litterman, "Global Portfolio Optimization", Financial Analysts Journal vol. 48, no. 5, pp. 28–43 (1992).
 F. Black, "Beta and Return", Journal of Portfolio Management, vol. 20 (1), pp. 8–18 (1993).
 F. Black, "Interest Rates as Options", Journal of Finance, vol. 50, pp. 1371–1376 (1995).
 Fischer Black, Exploring General Equilibrium, MIT Press, 1995. ISBN 0262514095

References

External links
 
 
  
 

 
 
 

1938 births
1995 deaths
Harvard College alumni
Financial economists
Deaths from esophageal cancer
University of Chicago faculty
Goldman Sachs people
Deaths from cancer in Connecticut
MIT Sloan School of Management faculty
20th-century American economists
Presidents of the American Finance Association